Garlic salt is a seasoned salt made of a mixture of dried, ground garlic and table salt with an anti-caking agent (e.g. calcium silicate). In its most basic form it is made by combining 3 parts salt and 1 part dried garlic powder by volume, or 6 parts salt and 1 part garlic powder by weight.

References

Herb and spice mixtures
Edible salt